Dutch Girls is a 1985 film, released by the London Weekend Television Company, produced by Sue Birtwistle, directed by Giles Foster, and written by William Boyd. The film is about a group of teenage boys who go to the Netherlands to play hockey. On the trip they drink, smoke, and try to have sex with girls. It features several well-known actors who were young at the time — Colin Firth, Timothy Spall, Adrian Lukis and James Wilby.

Cast
Colin Firth as Neil Truelove
Timothy Spall as Lyndon Baines Jellicoe
Bill Paterson as Mr Mole
James Wilby as Dundine
Adrian Lukis as Murray
Hywel Williams-Ellis as Lamb
Gusta Gerritsen as Romelia
Sylvia Millecam as Greetje
Anne Wil Blankers as Mrs Van Der Merwe
Colin McFarlane as Mkwela
Erik Plooyer as Mr Van Der Merwe
Richard Torn as Kees Van Der Merwe
Stephanie Verwijmeren as Anna Van Der Merwe

References
Review of Dutch Girls at DVDtalk

External links

 

1985 television films
1985 films
1980s coming-of-age comedy-drama films
1980s teen comedy-drama films
1985 independent films
British coming-of-age comedy-drama films
British independent films
British teen comedy-drama films
London Weekend Television shows
Television series by ITV Studios
Field hockey films
Films set in Amsterdam
Films with screenplays by William Boyd (writer)
Films directed by Giles Foster
1980s English-language films
1980s British films
British comedy-drama television films